Hungary competed at the 2022 World Athletics Championships in Eugene, Oregon, from 15 to 24 July. Hungary entered 2 athletes.

Results

Men
Field events

Women
Combined events – Heptathlon

References

External links
 

Nations at the 2022 World Athletics Championships
World Championships in Athletics
Hungary at the World Championships in Athletics